Dr. Syed Tufail Hasan is an Indian politician who has been a Member of Lok Sabha for Moradabad since 2019.

Education
He is a trained doctor (surgeon) with MBBS and MS degrees from Jawaharlal Nehru Medical College, Aligarh of Aligarh Muslim University.

Political career
Hasan has served as mayor of Moradabad and switched to Bahujan Samaj Party in 2009 from Samajwadi Party. 
In 2014 Indian general election, Hasan contested from Moradabad constituency as a candidate of Samajwadi Party and was defeated by Kunwar Sarvesh Kumar Singh of Bharatiya Janata Party. On 30 March 2019, the party announced that Hasan would contest the upcoming 2019 Indian general election from Moradabad in place of Haji Nasir Qureshi. This was done as the local party leaders resented when Hasan was denied a ticket. On 23 May, he was elected to Lok Sabha after defeating Kunwar Sarvesh Kumar Singh by 97,878 votes.

References

External links
MyNeta

Living people
Bahujan Samaj Party politicians
Samajwadi Party politicians
India MPs 2019–present
1958 births